This List of Minnesota ants lists all identified ant species found within Minnesota's borders.

Ponerinae
Ponera pennsylvanica

Myrmicinae
Aphaenogaster mariae
A. picea
A. picea rudis
A. tennesseensis
A. treatae
Crematogaster cerasi
Crematogaster lineolata
Harpagoxenus canadensis
Leptothorax ambiguous
L. longispinosus
L. muscorum
L. texanus
L. texanus davisi
Monomorium minimum
M. pharaonis Pharaoh ant
Myrmica alaskensi
M. americana
M. detrinodis
M. emeryana
M. evanida
M. fracticornis
M. incomplete
M. lobifrons
M. punctiventris
M. sculptilis
Pheidole bicarinata
P. pilifera
Protomognathus americanus
Smithistruma perandei (Strumigenys pergandei) 
S. pulchella (Strumigenys pulchella) 
Solenopsis molesta
Stenamma brevicorne
S. diecki
S. impar
S. schmitti

Dolichoderinae
Dolichoderus mariae
Dolichoderus plagiatus (Hypoclinea plagiata) 
D. pustulatus (Hypoclinea pustulatas) 
D. taschenbergi (Hypoclinea taschenbergi) 
Dorymyrmex pyramicus
Forelius pruinosus (Iridomyrmex pruinosum) 
Tapinoma melanocephalum Ghost Ant (tropical species found in greenhouses in Hennepin and Ramsey counties) 
T. sessile

Formicinae
Acanthomyops clavige
A. interjectus
A. latipes
A. occidentalis
A. plumopilosus
A. pubescens
A. subglaber
Brachymyrmex depilis
Camponotus americanus
C. discolor (C. caryae discolor) 
C. herculeanus
C. modoc (C. pennsylvanicus modoc) 
C. nearcticus
C. noveboracensis
C. pennsylvanicus
Formica argentea
F. aserva (F. subnuda) 
F. bradleyi
F. ciliate
F. dakotensis
F. emeryi
F. exsectoides
F. fossaceps
F. fusca
F. glacialis
F. hewitti
F. impexa
F. incerta
F. lasioides
F. limata
F. montana
F. neogagates
F. neorufibarbis
F. obscuripes
F. obscuriventris(F. rufa gymnamma) 
F. obtusopilosa
F. nitidiventris
F. oreas comptula
F. podzolica
F. reflexa
F. spatulata
F. subsericea
F. pergandei(F. sublucida) 
F. ulkei
F. whymperi adamsi
Lasius alienus (L. alienus americanus) 
L. minutus (L. bicornis minutus) 
L. flavus (L. brevicornis) 
L. nearcticus (L. flavus nearcticus) 
L. neoniger (L. niger neoniger) 
L. pallitarsis
L. speculiventris
L. subumbratus
L. umbratus (L. subumbratus epinotalis, L. umbratus aphidcola) 
Paratrechina parvula
Polyergus breviceps (rusfescens fusciventris, rufescens fusciventris) 
Prenolepis imparis
Yeongsunperi Parksi

References
Preliminary list and distribution of the ants of Minnesota

Minnesota
Ants
Minnesota
L